William E. "Bill" Sharer (born September 22, 1959) is an American politician. He serves as a Republican member of the New Mexico Senate, representing the 1st district which is fully situated in San Juan County and consists of most if not all of the city of Farmington.

Early life
Sharer was born in Albuquerque, New Mexico and grew up in Farmington, New Mexico. He graduated from Farmington High School, the New Mexico Military Institute and New Mexico State University.

Career
He served as an infantryman in the United States Army.

He was elected to the New Mexico Senate in 2000, and he has served as a state senator since 2001, where he sits on the Corporations & Transportation and Conservation committees.

Sharer led the charge against same-sex marriage in New Mexico in 2013, filing a lawsuit against the clerk of Doña Ana County when he began issuing marriage licenses to same-sex couples.

References

External links
 Senator William E. Sharer - (R) at New Mexico Legislature
 

1959 births
Living people
Politicians from Albuquerque, New Mexico
People from Farmington, New Mexico
New Mexico State University alumni
Republican Party New Mexico state senators
21st-century American politicians